Ali Rabee (Arabic:علي ربيع) (born 19 March 1983) is an Emirati footballer. He currently plays as a goalkeeper .

Career
He formerly played for Al-Fujairah, Al-Wahda, Ajman, and Al-Ahli.

References

External links
 

1983 births
Living people
Emirati footballers
Fujairah FC players
Al Wahda FC players
Ajman Club players
Al Ahli Club (Dubai) players
UAE Pro League players
UAE First Division League players
Association football goalkeepers
Place of birth missing (living people)